Argha is a Market Center in Sandhikharka Municipality of Arghakhanchi District in Lumbini Province of southern Nepal. Its fort (kot) was the centre of a former Chaubisi kingdom, Argha rajya, which was annexed to Nepal in 1786. The former village development committee (VDC) was converted into a municipality on 18 May 2014 by merging the existing Sandhikharka, wangla, Narapani, Khanchikot, Keemadada, Argha and Dibharna VDCs. At the time of the 1991 Nepal census, the town had a population of 8,248 living in 1,712 houses. At the time of the 2001 Nepal census, the population was 5,947, of which 60% was literate.

References

Populated places in Arghakhanchi District